is a 1975 Japanese horror film directed by Yoichi Takabayashi, based on the mystery novel The Honjin Murders (1946) by Seishi Yokomizo. It was entered into the 26th Berlin International Film Festival.

Cast
 Akira Nakao as Kindaichi Kosuke
 Junko Takazawa as Suzuko Ichiyanagi
 Takahiro Tamura as Kenzou Ichiyanagi
 Akira Nitta as Saburō Ichiyanagi
 Fujio Tokita as the Man With Three Fingers

References

External links

1975 films
1975 horror films
Japanese horror films
1970s Japanese-language films
Japanese haunted house films
Films directed by Yoichi Takabayashi
Films set in country houses
1970s Japanese films